The Lonesome Trail is a 1945 American Western film directed by Oliver Drake and Lindsley Parsons, starring Jimmy Wakely, Lee "Lasses" White, and John James. It premiered in New York City on December 8, 1945.

Cast

 Jimmy Wakely as Jimmy Wakely
 Lee "Lasses" White as Lasses White
 John James as Dusty James
 Iris Clive as Rita Kelly
 Horace Murphy as Judge Melford
 Lorraine Miller as Elsie Melford
 Eddie Majors as Pete Jones
 Zon Murray as Vincent Worth
 Roy Butler as Pop
 Jasper Palmer as Billy
 Frank McCarroll as Spike Brown
 Jack Hendricks as Henchie
 Jack Pitts as Citizen
 Billy Hammond as Stagecoach driver
 Frank Neill as Dr. O'Neill
 Dee Cooper as Rancher
 The Sunshine Girls
 Arthur B. Smith as Arthur Smith

References

1945 Western (genre) films
1945 films
American black-and-white films
American Western (genre) films
Films directed by Oliver Drake
Monogram Pictures films
1940s English-language films
1940s American films